Steve Bacic is a Canadian actor. He is known for playing the characters Gaheris and Telemachus Rhade on the Sci-Fi series Gene Roddenberry's Andromeda. After guest starring in seasons 1-3 as both characters, he joined the cast early in season 4 as Telemachus. In total, he was in 44 of the 110 Andromeda episodes. Beginning in 2013, he co-starred as "Jason" in Hallmark Movies & Mysteries channel Garage Sale Mysteries series of TV films.

Biography

In his mid-twenties, a road trip with friends led to settling into Vancouver, British Columbia, where, intrigued by all the television and film production going on there, he decided to stay and took acting classes. He read for a bit part in the 5th season of 21 Jump Street but instead landed the lead guest-starring role.

His television roles have included appearances on Street Justice, The Outer Limits, Highlander, Stargate SG-1, Smallville, ER, Republic of Doyle and The X-Files where he played a SWAT officer who douses himself with gasoline in a memorable episode. His film appearances include The 6th Day, Threshold, X2 and the Hallmark Channel film The Colt, and Deck the Halls, Safe Harbor and She Made Them Do It on Lifetime.

Bacic also played Prince Barin in the 2007 Flash Gordon TV series. His TV series The Guard premiered January 22, 2008 on Global Television Network in Canada. He plays Miro Da Silva, one of the four leads. The series is a drama series about the Canadian Coast Guard. He was cast as "Dark Archer" in the ninth season of Smallville in episode 10 called "Disciple". He played Goran on the HBO series Big Love, season 4. He also plays the character Trevor Wilson (formerly Bobby) in season one of ‘’Julie and the Phantoms’’.

Filmography

Film

Television

Awards

References

External links

Steve Bacic's official site (copy archived February 16, 2020)

Male actors from Vancouver
Male actors from Windsor, Ontario
Canadian male film actors
Canadian people of Croatian descent
Canadian male television actors
Croatian emigrants to Canada
Living people
People from Zadar County
Year of birth missing (living people)